Alderman Robin Leslie Cree, MBE (born 15 July 1941, Bangor, County Down) is a Unionist politician from Northern Ireland. He was an Ulster Unionist Party MLA for North Down from 2003 to 2016.

He was educated at Bangor Grammar School, Bangor Technical College and Belfast College of Commerce. Cree is a former Senior Executive and Director of a major International Energy Company. He has been a member of North Down Borough Council for Ballyholme and Groomsport from 1988 and is a member of all North Down Borough Council's Standing Committees.

Cree was also Mayor and Deputy Mayor (1990–1992) of North Down. Cree was Chairman of the North Down District Policing Partnership (DPP) until his appointment to the Northern Ireland Policing Board in 2007. He is Director of the Holywood and Bangor Town Centre Management Company.

Personal life
 He was named MBE for community service in 2001.
 Alderman Cree is an Elder and Secretary of his local Church. He is also a member of Loyal and Masonic Orders.

References

External links
 NI Assembly biography
 Link to BBC profile

1941 births
Living people
People from Bangor, County Down
People educated at Bangor Grammar School
Members of the Order of the British Empire
Ulster Unionist Party MLAs
Northern Ireland MLAs 2003–2007
Northern Ireland MLAs 2007–2011
Northern Ireland MLAs 2011–2016
Members of North Down Borough Council
Mayors of places in Northern Ireland